Joseph Paul Jernigan (January 31, 1954 – August 5, 1993) was a Texas murderer who was executed by lethal injection at 12:31 a.m.

In 1981, Jernigan was found guilty of "cold-blooded murder" and sentenced to death for killing Edward Hale, a 75-year-old homeowner who discovered Jernigan and his accomplice, Roy Lamb as they were burglarizing his home. 

Jernigan spent 12 years in prison before his final plea for clemency was denied. At the prompting of a prison chaplain, he agreed to donate his body for scientific research or medical use. After execution, his cadaver was sectioned and photographed for the Visible Human Project and the University of Colorado School of Medicine by Dr. Vic Spitzer and associates. He is the subject of an HBO documentary Virtual Corpse and also appeared on the British video game TV series GamesMaster'''s gore special.

Jernigan had no last words.

Lamb pleaded guilty to murder, received a 30-year sentence, and was paroled in 1991.

See also
 Capital punishment in Texas
 List of people executed in Texas, 1990–1999

References

External links
 . Texas Department of Criminal Justice. Retrieved on 2007-11-20.
 . Texas Department of Criminal Justice'' (2003-09-12). Archived from the original on 2003-12-02. Retrieved on 2007-11-20.

1954 births
1993 deaths
American people convicted of murder
People executed for murder
Executed people from Illinois
20th-century executions by Texas
People executed by Texas by lethal injection
People convicted of murder by Texas
People from Geneva, Illinois
20th-century executions of American people